Enchoria is a genus of moths in the family Geometridae.

Species
 Enchoria herbicolata (Hulst, 1896)
 Enchoria lacteata (Packard, 1876)
 Enchoria osculata Hulst, 1896

References
 Enchoria at Markku Savela's Lepidoptera and Some Other Life Forms
 Natural History Museum Lepidoptera genus database

Xanthorhoini
Taxa named by George Duryea Hulst
Geometridae genera